The Beara Junior A Football Championship is an annual Gaelic football competition organised by the Beara Board of the Gaelic Athletic Association since 1927 for junior Gaelic football teams in the Beara Peninsula in County Cork, Ireland.

The championship is currently suspended due to the fact that there are no teams categorised as junior A in the division. The title has been won at least once by eight different clubs. The all-time record-holders are Urhan, who have won a total of 28 titles. 

The Beara Junior Championship is an integral part of the wider Cork Junior A Football Championship. The winners of the Beara championship join their counterparts from the other seven divisions to contest the county championship.

Roll of honour

List of finals

Records

By decade

The most successful team of each decade, judged by number of Beara Junior A Football Championship titles, is as follows:

 1920s: 1 each for Urhan (1927), Garnsih (1928) and Adrigole (1929)
 1930s: 3 each for Bere Island (1930-36-39) and Urhan (1931-33-34)
 1940s: 2 each for Garnish (1940-48), Bere Island (1941-42), Uhan (1943-44) and Castletownbere (1947-49)
 1950s: 6 for Urhan (1950-55-56-57-58-59)
 1960s: 4 each for Adrigole (1961-62-66-68) and Castletownbere (1963-65-67-69)
 1970s: 4 for Castletownbere (1974-75-76-77)
 1980s: 5 for Urhan (1980-82-83-87-88)
 1990s: 4 for Adrigole (1993-94-98-99)
 2000s: 6 for Adrigole (2000-01-02-04-05-06)
 2010s: 5 each for Urhan (2010-11-12-15-19) and Garnish (2013-14-16-17-18)

Gaps

Top ten longest gaps between successive championship titles:
 39 years: Bere Island (1942-1981)
 24 years: Garnish (1953-1978)
 23 years: Adrigole (1938-1961)
 16 years: Garnish (1979-1995)
 15 years: Urhan (1992-2007)
 14 years: Castletownbere (1949-1963)
 14 years: Urhan (1959-1973)
 12 years: Adrigole (1972-1984)
 10 years: St. Mary's, Ardgroom (1954-1964)
 10 years: Garnish (2003-2013)

See also
Beara GAA

References

Beara Junior Football Championship